The Blue Ridge Limited was one of six daily American  named passenger trains operated by the Baltimore and Ohio Railroad (B&O) during the late 1930s between Washington, D. C. and Chicago, Illinois, via Pittsburgh, Pennsylvania.  Inaugurated in 1934, the once high-status train was discontinued in 1949.

History
In 1934, the B&O's eastbound train number 16 was named the Blue Ridge Limited and in 1937 its westbound counterpart, train 15 was also named the Blue Ridge Limited.

With ridership dropping after World War II, the B&O discontinued the Blue Ridge Limited on February 20, 1949.

Schedule and equipment
In the early years, the Blue Ridge Limiteds consist was consistent with a first-class train, including reclining seats in coaches, a sleeper and a lounge with sleeping accommodations. A diner car, added in Pittsburgh, served breakfast and lunch to passengers going west.  It was steam-powered until well after World War II.

The westbound Blue Ridge Limited left Washington a few hours ahead of the Shenandoah but had a slower schedule due to the numerous head-end cars it carried. The eastbound Blue Ridge Limiteds schedule was revised in 1938 so that it began in Pittsburgh, instead of Chicago, thus reducing the number of Chicago-Washington trains.

A lounge car was added in 1945 between Washington and Akron to increase ridership, and in 1947 the lounge car was extended all the way to Chicago.

Stations

References

Named passenger trains of the United States
Passenger trains of the Baltimore and Ohio Railroad
Night trains of the United States
Railway services introduced in 1934
Railway services discontinued in 1949